Ma'an Abu Nowar (July 26, 1928 – September 22, 2016) was a Jordanian Ambassador.

Career
In 1943 he joined Royal Jordanian Army.
From 1957 to  he was commander of the predominantly Bedouin Princess Alia Brigade an Infantry brigade.
In 1963 he was counselor, Jordanian Embassy London.
From 1964 to  he was director of the Jordan Civil Defense 
From  to  he was director of Jordan Public Security.
From 1969 to  he was Assistant Chief of Staff for General Affairs.
In 1972 he was Minister of Culture and Information.
From 1973 to  he was ambassador in London (United Kingdom).

In 1976 he was Secretary of the capital, Amman.
In 1979 he was minister of Public Works.
In 1980 he was  minister of Culture, Youth and Minister of Tourism and Antiquities.
In 1989 he was Assistant Chief of Staff, editor of Al-Aqsa (newspaper of the Jordanian Armed Forces) director of Moral Guidance and published: The History of the Hashemite Kingdom of Jordan: The creation and development of Transjordan, 1920-1929.
In 1993 he was minister of Information.
In 1994 he was appointed deputy Prime Minister and member of the Senate.
In 1997 he retired from public service.
He was a first class member of the Order of the Star of Jordan.

References

1928 births
2016 deaths
Information ministers of Jordan
Ambassadors of Jordan to the United Kingdom
Public works ministers of Jordan
Tourism ministers of Jordan
Members of the Senate of Jordan